Elenore Sturko is a Canadian politician who was elected MLA for Surrey South in a by-election in 2022.

Biography 
Sturko formerly worked as a spokesperson for the Royal Canadian Mounted Police.

See also 

 42nd Parliament of British Columbia

References 

Living people
Year of birth missing (living people)
Place of birth missing (living people)
21st-century Canadian women politicians
21st-century Canadian politicians
Women MLAs in British Columbia
British Columbia Liberal Party MLAs